Tioga is an unincorporated community in Mahaska County, in the U.S. state of Iowa.

History
Tioga was platted in 1886. It was named after Tioga, Tioga County, Pennsylvania. A post office opened in Tioga in 1886 and closed in 1920.

Tioga's population was 30 in 1902, and 45 in 1925.

References

Unincorporated communities in Mahaska County, Iowa
1886 establishments in Iowa
Unincorporated communities in Iowa